Suyo may refer to:

 Suyo District, in the province of Ayabaca, Peru
 Suyo, Ilocos Sur, municipality in the Philippines